The Rugby Union Players' Association (RUPA) is the representative body for professional rugby union players in Australia. It was formed in October 1995 in response to the professionalism of rugby.

As soon as a player signs a Rugby contract in Australia they are offered the chance to become a RUPA member regardless of nationality. , all of Australia's professional and semi-professional Rugby players were RUPA members, including male and female professionals across Rugby Sevens and 15-a-side Rugby, totalling approximately 400 players.

RUPA also provides support services for all past (retired) professional Rugby players.

Members
Its members comprise the following:
 Players on the Australia national rugby union team (the Wallabies)
 Players for the country's five Super Rugby and Super W sides: the NSW Waratahs, Queensland Reds, Brumbies, Western Force and the Melbourne Rebels
 Players from Australia's Men's and Women's Rugby Sevens squads
 Players from the Buildcorp National Rugby Championship (NRC)
 All past professional players in Australia since 1996

History
In August 1995, the ARU, NSWRU, QRU and the ACTRU agreed to support the establishment of a players’ association and to loan it $10,000.00 for set up costs and to allow it distribute television revenue. The RUPA was established and the following month, an initial steering committee made of Tony Dempsey, Ewen McKenzie, George Gregan, Damien Smith, Mark Harthill, Tim Kava, Rod McCall and Rod Kafer was formed with Dempsey being elected president in December 1995.

Dempsey remained as president until the end of 2009 when he resigned and was replaced by Omar Hassanein as acting chief. Greg Harris was appointed as chief executive officer (CEO) of RUPA in 2010, and upon his departure in February 2015 Ross Xenos was appointed in his place.

Executive 
RUPA has a thirteen-person Executive, currently led by President Benn Robinson and chairman Bruce Hodgkinson SC.

Full RUPA board as of 11 February 2016:
 Benn Robinson (President)
 Bruce Hodgksinon SC (Chairman) Head of Denman Chambers
 Ross Xenos (chief executive officer & Director)
 Matt Hodgson (Western Force Player Director)
 James Slipper (Reds' Player Director)
 Stephen Moore (Brumbies Player Director)
 Bernard Foley (Waratahs Player Director)
 Mike Harris (Rebels Player Director)
 Ed Jenkins (Rugby Sevens Director (M))
 Gemma Etheridge (Rugby Sevens Director (F))
 Adam Wallace-Harrison (Co-Opted Director)
 Shannon Parry (Co-Opted Director)
 Sally Fielke (Co-Opted Director) GM, Corporate Affairs at Sydney Airport

Staff 
RUPA's head office is based in Camperdown, Sydney, New South Wales. , working out of the head office are: Ross Xenos (chief executive officer), Rosemary Towner (general manager, Player Development), Toby Duncan (general manager, Player Services & Operations), Adrian Turner (Legal Counsel), Patrick Phibbs (Player Welfare Manager) and Pete Fairbairn (Communications Manager).

RUPA also employ Player Development Managers based at the five Australian Super Rugby franchises, dealing exclusively with the players at their allocated franchise. , they are Samantha Cox (Western Force), Robin Duff (Brumbies), Lachlan McBain (Waratahs), Matthew Smith (Reds) and Cameron Yorke (Rebels).

Objectives
RUPA's objectives are:
 Provision of an Association that promotes and advances Rugby in Australia
 Promotion and protection of the interests and safeguarding rights of members
 To secure and maintain freedom from unjust and unlawful rules and regulations affecting member's careers
 Assisting Members in securing employment
 Assisting Members in their study pursuits
 Obtaining member benefits
 To provide legal advice and legal assistance
 Election of Members as directors to the Boards of Directors of the ARU, ACTRU, NSWRU, QRU, VRU and WARU Boards

Collective Bargaining

RUPA engages in collective bargaining on behalf of its members with their employers. There have been three agreements:

First Collective Bargaining Agreement
In October 1997  RUPA negotiated its first collective bargaining agreement with the ARU, NSWRU, QRU and ACTRU that provided a regulatory framework for the employment of professional rugby players in. Key features of this collective bargaining agreement included:
 A minimum wage for Super 12 players and a standard player contract
 An increase in death and total disability insurance for players
 It established a joint committee on players’ safety and welfare and an 8-week lay off period each year for players
 A career training scheme to provide players with vocational and career skills after rugby was established
Dispute resolution procedures
 A requirement that rugby bodies pay 25% of player generated revenue to players each year

Second Collective Bargaining Agreement
A second Collective Bargaining Agreement was implemented in April 2001 that expanded on the 1997 Agreement. Key features of this Agreement included:
 An increase in the players’ share of player generated revenue from 25% to 30%
 An increase in the average salary per player from $120,000 to $138,000 as well as an increase in minimum salary from $28,940 to $45,000
 Revenue sharing in use of players’ signatures on memorabilia and increased protection of players’ images
 Career Training Scheme funding went from $110,000 to $550,000

Third Collective Bargaining Agreement
A Third Collective Bargaining Agreement came into place in December 2004. This agreement addressed issues surrounding player burnout, agent accreditation, occupational health and safety, compulsory tertiary educationas well as improvement of the employment conditions for all players.

Awards

RUPA Medal for Excellence
The RUPA Medal for Excellence is awarded annually to the Australian player who is voted by his peers as having excelled both on and off the field during the season. All full-time professional players who are members of RUPA are eligible to vote. The inaugural winner was George Gregan in 2001. Gregan won the award three times in total, following up 2001 by winning the Medal for Excellence in 2004 and 2006 as well.

Nathan Sharpe has won the Medal for Excellence a record four times (2002, 2005, 2011 and 2012), with George Smith (2007 and 2008) and David Pocock (2010 and 2015) the other multiple recipients.

Brendan Cannon (2003), Berrick Barnes (2009), Nick Cummins (2013) and James Slipper (2014) are the other winners of the RUPA Medal for Excellence.

The John Eales Medal

In June 2002 the ARU and RUPA jointly launched an award to honour the game's best Wallaby player each season, named after Wallaby legend John Eales. The John Eales Medal is awarded to the player judged by his peers as the team's outstanding player. The inaugural John Eales Medal was won in 2002 by George Smith who won it again in 2008.

Newcomer of the Year 
First introduced in 2006 when it was won by Berrick Barnes, all five Australian Super Rugby teams have seen at least one of their players receive this prestigious award. The Newcomer of the Year is awarded to any first-year contracted player who has not only excelled in their performances on the field, but has also made significant achievements with their education and support of the community.

Of the first ten recipients of the Award, eight have thus far gone on to represent the Wallabies.

Winners:

Berrick Barnes (2006), David Pocock (2007), Ben Lucas (2008), Laurie Weeks (2009), Pat McCabe (2010), Ben Tapuai (2011), Joe Tomane (2012), Israel Folau (2013), Sean McMahon (2014), Sefa Naivalu (2015).

People's Choice Player of the Year 
Introduced in 2013, the RUPA People's Choice Player of the Year is awarded to the player deemed by members of the public to have best displayed the 'spirit of Rugby' in all their pursuits of a calendar year. The results are formulated from a web-based vote.

The past winners of the award are Israel Folau (2013), Matt Hodgson (2014) and David Pocock (2015).

Men's and Women's Rugby Sevens Players' Player of the Year 
The Men's and Women's Sevens Players' Player are awarded to the male and female sevens players that best embody performance, discipline, leadership and consistency as voted by their peers.

Community Service Award 
The RUPA Foundation Community Service Award is awarded to acknowledge a contracted player who has not only excelled in their performances on the field, but has also dedicated a significant amount of time and effort to the development of their community and various charitable initiatives.

Academic Achievement Award 
Introduced in 2011, the Academic Achievement Award is awarded to any contracted player who has undertaken and excelled in academic pursuits of any level. It is not the 'Dux' of RUPA's members, rather it acknowledges players' dedication and commitment to their personal and professional development across a broad range of studies as is not confined to university level education.

NRC Players' Player 
A new award introduced in 2014, the NRC Players' Player recognises the player adjudged by his peers to have been the best performer during the Buildcorp NRC competition. Five finalists are selected, and then voted upon by NRC players on a 3–2–1 basis.

The inaugural winner was Brisbane City's Samu Kerevi, with Ita Vaea (UC Vikings) winning the award in 2015.

Services/Player Development Program

Player Development Managers
The Australian Rugby Union and The Rugby Union Players Association jointly appointed the first National Player Development Manager in July 2001.

Now, there are Player Development Managers employed at every Australian Super Rugby team, and one employed to oversee both the Men's and Women's Rugby Sevens programs.

The role of a Player Development Manager includes providing support in the areas of career and education, career placement program, financial and legal support and personnel counselling for players.

Player Services Manager
In October 2003 RUPA appointed a Manager of Player Services whose role it is to enhance the overall level of membership benefits including implementation of Player Agent Accreditation Scheme and the development of the ARU/RUPA Player Safety and Welfare Committee.

RUPA Induction Camp 
Since 2001, RUPA has held an annual Induction Camp for all first-year contracted players. The players assemble in Sydney and spend two and a half days in RUPA's care, receiving training and participating in a number of workshops, presentations and activities designed to best prepare them for their first year of professional Rugby in Australia. They are educated about Australian Rugby policies including the code of conduct, and topics such as cultural diversity, cyber security, domestic violence, road safety, overcoming adversity and more.

The Camp is a core component of RUPA's Player Development Program (PDP), which employs five Player Development Managers who each work within the Australian Super Rugby teams. RUPA's PDP is a proactive, player-focused initiative that assists professionally contracted Rugby players from the rookie level through to transition and beyond post retirement. The Program offers support in all areas off the field, including education, professional training, mental health, career and financial matters.

In 2015, the RUPA Induction Camp was held in Coogee, with 31 players from across the country in attendance.

Occupational Health and Safety Committee
The first OHS Committee meeting was held in 2005 to recommend to the rugby bodies how to ensure the health, safety and welfare of all professional players.

Membership of other bodies

International Rugby Players Association
RUPA was a founding member of the International Rugby Players’ Association (IRPA). IRPA's members include the Player Associations from England, (RPA), South Africa (SARPA), New Zealand (NZRPA) and France (Provale).

In 2003 they were joined by the Irish and Welsh bodies, IRUPA and WRPA. In 2006, the Scottish players body SRPA also became members. They have been joined in recent years by Pacific Island Players' Association (PIPA), Japan Rugby Players' Association (JRPA) and GIRA (Italy).

Its objectives are to promote, advance and protect the interest and objects of its members and to be the representative voice of all members on issues of importance to the international professional game.

Australian Athletes Alliance
RUPA is also a member of the Australian Athletes Alliance, an advocate on behalf of Australian athletes at state and national level.

References

Sports organizations established in 1995
Rugby union players representative bodies
Rugby union players in Australia
1995 establishments in Australia
Trade unions in Australia
Trade unions established in 1995
Super Rugby
Super W
National Rugby Championship